Mark Thomas Rhodes (born 11 September 1981) is an English singer, actor and television presenter.

Career
Born in Wolverhampton, England, Rhodes finished in second place in the second series of Pop Idol in the United Kingdom, runner-up to Michelle McManus. After Pop Idol, he teamed up with third-place Sam Nixon, releasing two singles under the name Sam & Mark. In February 2004, their cover of the song "With a Little Help from My Friends" reached number 1 in the UK singles chart, remaining there for one week. Their second single 'The Sun Has Come Your Way" reached 19 in the singles chart. The pair were subsequently encourage by manager Simon Fuller to pursue a career in TV.

Rhodes went on to co-present Top of the Pops Reloaded with Nixon and Fearne Cotton in 2004. From April 2006, Rhodes co-hosted the weekday children's breakfast show Level Up on BBC Two alongside Nixon and Ayesha Asantewaa. Level Up finished its first series in September 2006.

In September 2006, Rhodes began presenting BBC Two's Saturday morning show TMi alongside Nixon and Caroline Flack. He had his own short segment on the show called "Question Mark", a feature where he tried to answer viewers' questions, but Flack and Nixon talk through it. In later series, Flack left and the show moved to Fridays. The show's final episode aired on 17 December 2010. He also co-presented Do Something Different with Nixon and Ayesha Asantewaa. Nixon and Rhodes have produced children's reality series, Who Wants to Be a Superhero? and Sam and Mark's Guide to Dodging Disaster.

In 2009, Rhodes co-presented the show Skate Nation on BBC Two. He presented  The duo were contestants on a celebrity version of 2010 Total Wipeout Celebrity Special, which aired on 2 January 2010. Rhodes fell at the quarter-final stage, losing out to eventual winner Danielle Lloyd. They subsequently took part in two episodes of Hole in the Wall, airing on 11 October 2008 and 14 November 2009.

Rhodes competed in the 2012 series of Dancing on Ice. He was eliminated by the judges on 22 January after a skate off with Dallas actress Charlene Tilton.

Hosts of family favourite CBBC family game show Copycats. Mark is perhaps best-known for presenting the return of the iconic Crackerjack (CBBC), eight series of Sam & Mark’s Big Friday Wind Up (CBBC), as well as the much loved Saturday morning live showTMi Friday on the CBBC Channel. 

Other very recent TV credits include The One Show and All Star Games for Sport Relief, both on BBC One.

Alongside an illustrious career in TV, Mark has also enjoyed much success with a weekend radio show on Free Radio. He has delighted fans with the live Sam and Mark On The Road Show across the UK at summer festivals, Butlins and as part of the Underbelly Festival, as well as across the world whilst touring with P&O Cruises.

As co-author of three children’s books published by Scholastic The Adventures of Long Arm, The Adventures of Long Arm 2: Revenge of the Supply Teacher and The Stink Before Christmas published in over six languages, Mark has also been a part of the UK Productions family for the past seven years and has appeared in pantomimes across the UK, this Christmas appearing in The Return of Captain Hook Croydon's Fairfield Halls theatre.
Outside of presenting and performing, Mark is a long-term ambassador for the Wolves Foundation as well as a patron of Whizz Kids and Kicks Count, all charities that are very close to his heart.

With numerous awards and award nominations under his belt, Mark has twice won ‘Best Presenter’ at the BAFTA Children & Young People's Awards in 2013 and 2015 respectively.

Awards and Nominations 

BAFTA Best Children’s Presenter

Winner: 

2013 (Sam and Mark’s Big Friday Wind Up)

2015 (Sam and Mark’s Big Friday Wind Up)

Nominations: 

2007, 2013, 2014, 2015, 2017, 2018 and 2019

BAFTA Best Children’s Entertainment Show

Winner:

2016 (Sam and Mark’s Big Friday Wind Up)

Nominations: 

2014, 2015 and 2016

RTS North West Awards Best Entertainment Show

Winner:

2015 (Sam and Mark’s Big Friday Wind Up)

2021 (Crackerjack)

Nominations:

2013, 2015 and 2021

Arqiva Commercial Radio Awards Best Newcomer:

Nomination:

2011

Personal life

Rhodes attended Darlaston Comprehensive High School in Darlaston. Rhodes splits his time between his house in St Margarets, London, and his family house in Wolverhampton, where he is regularly seen socialising in the village of Wombourne. 

He got engaged in March 2011 and married his girlfriend Harriet Wilson on 2 June 2012. They now have a daughter, Scarlett and a son, Teddy, born at the end of April 2016.

Rhodes is a Wolverhampton Wanderers fan and played on the All Stars side at Matt Murray's testimonial match in 2011. He also played in Jody Craddock's testimonial match as part of a Wolves XI at Molineux in 2014.

Pop Idol 2 performances

Filmography

Discography

Singles
as Sam & Mark
"With a Little Help from My Friends" (February 2004)
"The Sun Has Come Your Way" (May 2004)

See also
Sam & Mark
Sam Nixon
Wombourne

References

External links

1981 births
Living people
21st-century British singers
People from Darlaston
Pop Idol contestants
Top of the Pops presenters